Khaleel ur Rehman (born 1948) from the Indian state of Karnataka, is better known by his pen name Khaleel Mamoon is a noted Urdu poet whose poetry collection Aafaaq ki Taraf won the 2011 Sahitya Akademi Award for works in Urdu.

Life and career
Mamoon was born in Bangalore. After working as a staff artist for All India Radio, Mamoon joined the Indian Police Service in 1977. He served in senior positions in Karnataka including as Inspector General.

Works
Mamoon has published a number of works. Lissan Falsafe Ke Aine Me on the philosophy of language was published in 1986. Unnees Lillahi Nazmen (1989) is a translation of poems written in praise of Prophet Mohammed by Scherzade Rikhye. Nishaat-e-Gham is a collections of Ghazals. Kannada Adab is a collection of translations of Kannada language poetry and fiction. Mamoon's poetry collection Aafaaq ki Taraf won the 2011 Sahitya Akademi Award for works in Urdu.

In 2004, Mamoon became the first Urdu writer to win the Karnataka Rajyotsava Prashasti.

Karnataka Urdu Academy chairmanship and removal controversy
Mamoon served as the Chairman of the Karnataka Urdu Academy between 2008 and 2010. He was removed in controversial circumstances in 2010 for functioning in an 'arrogant manner'. H.S. Shivaprakash, Dean, School of Arts and Aesthetics, Jawaharlal Nehru University resigned from the Karnataka Sahitya Academy in protest of government interference in an autonomous body.

References

Urdu-language poets from India
Writers from Bangalore
Recipients of the Sahitya Akademi Award in Urdu
Living people
1948 births
Indian male poets
Indian Muslims
Indian police officers
20th-century Indian poets
Poets from Karnataka
20th-century Indian male writers
Recipients of the Rajyotsava Award 2004